Coolhaven is an underground subway station in the Dutch city of Rotterdam. It is served by Rotterdam Metro lines A, B, and C. The station, with one island platform, opened on 10 May 1982 as the western terminus of the East-West Line (also formerly called Calandlijn). Coolhaven was the terminus until 1986, when the line was extended to Marconiplein. The station is named for the adjacent Coolhaven harbour basin. It also has images of Rotterdam along its platforms.

At the end of 2006 the station was renovated. The walls now show pictures of Rotterdam and the pillars in the middle of the station were repainted.

References

Rotterdam Metro stations
Railway stations opened in 1982
1982 establishments in the Netherlands
Railway stations in the Netherlands opened in the 20th century